Eudocima discrepans is a moth of the family Erebidae first described by Francis Walker in 1858. It is found in the north-eastern part of the Himalayas, western China, Singapore, Thailand and Sundaland.

The larvae feed on Tinomiscium petiolare.

References

External links

Eudocima
Moths described in 1858